Shrink Dust is the fifth studio album by Canadian musician Chad VanGaalen. It was released by Flemish Eye in Canada and Sub Pop in the United States on April 29, 2014. The album was featured on the Toronto Star's website as part of their musical "reasons to live" sections.

The album was a longlisted nominee for the 2014 Polaris Music Prize.

The album was the most played across Canadian community radio in May, June, and July 2013, as tracked by the National Campus and Community Radio Association's charting service, !earshot.

Background
The album was recorded in VanGaalen's Yoko Eno studio in Calgary. The album is partially intended to be a score to his upcoming sci-fi movie, and also, according to VanGaalen, a country record.

Track listing
All songs written by Chad VanGaalen.
 "Cut Off My Hands"
 "Where Are You?"
 "Frozen Paradise"
 "Lila"
 "Weighed Sin"
 "Monster"
 "Evil"
 "Leaning on Bells"
 "All Will Combine"
 "Weird Love"
 "Hangman's Son"
 "Cosmic Destroyer"

References

2014 albums
Chad VanGaalen albums
Flemish Eye albums
Sub Pop albums